Lemzo Diamono was a Senegalese musical group, well known in the 1990s. The group was mainly active from 1990 to 1998.

Group members
Past members
Lamine Faye
Alioune Mbaye Nder
Salam Diallo
Mada Ba
Fallou Dieng
Amath Samb
Amy Mbengue
Alié Diagne
Moustapha Faye
Pape Diouf
Moussa Traoré
Sanou Diouf
Moustapha Fall
Ma Anta Faye
Abdoulaye Diallo
Khadim Ndiaye
Thierno Kouyaté
Mamadou Lamine Maïga
Cheikh Ba

Discography
Here is a list of Lemzo Diamono's albums

Studio albums 
1992: Vol.1: Jom (cassette; Talla Diagne)
1992: Vol.2: Setsima (cassette; Saprom)
1993: Vol.3: Xarnu Bi (cassette; Adama Sene)
1994: Masla-Bi(1ere Partie) (cassette; Talla Diagne)
1994: Akara (cassette; Talla Diagne)
1995: Hors Serie: Simb (cassette; Talla Diagne)
1996: Vol.5 (cassette; Talla Diagne)
1997: Marimbalax (CD; Stern's, STCD 1076)
1998: Co Co Rico (Cassette; no label)

Live albums 
1997:En Live Diapason vol 1 (cassette; KSF)
1997:En Live Diapason vol 2 (cassette; KSF)

References

Senegalese musical groups
20th-century Senegalese male singers
People from Dakar
Wolof-language singers
1990 establishments in Senegal